Kevin Allen Chapman (born February 19, 1988) is an American former professional baseball pitcher. He played in Major League Baseball (MLB) for the Houston Astros from 2013 to 2016.

Career
Chapman was drafted by the Detroit Tigers in the 42nd round of the 2006 MLB draft out of Westminster Academy in Fort Lauderdale, Florida, but did not sign and attended the University of Florida. He was then drafted by the Chicago White Sox in the 50th round of the 2009 Major League Baseball Draft, but again chose not to sign and returned to Florida. The Kansas City Royals drafted him in the fourth round of the 2010 MLB draft and he signed. Chapman was traded to the Houston Astros in 2012.

Houston Astros
Chapman was invited to spring training in 2013 and received his first callup to MLB later that season on August 8. He was optioned to the Oklahoma City RedHawks on April 17, 2014, and recalled on July 1. He was optioned the next day, and recalled for the second time that season on August 15. Chapman started the 2015 season with the Fresno Grizzlies, after spending spring training at the major league level. He was recalled in May, and returned to the minor leagues later that month. Chapman began the 2016 season in the minor leagues. He was called up to the major leagues on August 11 to fill out the roster for a doubleheader. At the end of the minor league season in September, Chapman was promoted to the major league level.

Chapman was eligible to represent Canada at the 2017 World Baseball Classic because his father was born in Ontario.

Atlanta Braves
Chapman was claimed off of waivers by the Atlanta Braves on March 13, 2017. He was assigned to the Triple-A Gwinnett Braves on March 31.

Minnesota Twins
On May 8, 2017, Chapman was traded to the Minnesota Twins in exchange for Danny Santana. He was released on June 13, 2017.

New Britain Bees
On April 3, 2018, Chapman signed with the New Britain Bees of the independent Atlantic League of Professional Baseball.

Detroit Tigers
On May 20, 2018, Chapman's contract was purchased by the Detroit Tigers. He elected free agency on November 2, 2018.

Personal
Chapman's cousin Matt den Dekker is a former professional baseball player.

References

External links

Florida Gators bio

1988 births
Living people
American sportspeople of Canadian descent
Baseball players from Florida
Corpus Christi Hooks players
Florida Gators baseball players
Fresno Grizzlies players
Gwinnett Braves players
Houston Astros players
Major League Baseball pitchers
New Britain Bees players
Northwest Arkansas Naturals players
Oklahoma City RedHawks players
Sportspeople from Coral Springs, Florida
Toledo Mud Hens players
Wilmington Blue Rocks players
World Baseball Classic players of Canada
2017 World Baseball Classic players